Kenneth Eugene Coffey (born November 7, 1960) is a former professional American football defensive back who played safety for five seasons for the Washington Redskins of the National Football League. He played college football at Southwest Texas State University and was drafted in the ninth round of the 1982 NFL Draft.He now resides with his wife Brenda, and four children Chelsea (26), Elliot (23), Chandler (21) and Madison (15).  Ken is an avid golfer and plays as often as time permits.  

1960 births
Living people
People from Rantoul, Illinois
American football safeties
Tyler Apaches football players
Texas State University alumni
Washington Redskins players